Veeramum Eeramum is a 2007 Indian Tamil language film directed by Sanjay Ram, which released on 5 October 2007. It starred Saravanan, Alex, Deepan Chakravarthy, Sanjay Ram, Krishna, Sonika, Thaniya, Anjusha and Sudhakar Vasanth in main roles.

Plot

Shankar Ayya(Saravanan) is the 'godfather' of Tuticorin and the villages around it, where the Arivaal( sickle used as a weapon to kill) culture prevails. The villagers respect him because of his stature as a do-gooder and a man who helps the poor and needy. His enemies led by his cousin Semmarai Pandian, a cruel and cunning man with a nose ring (Sudhakar Vasanth) hate him due to decades old enmity between the two families. So blood flows as frequent gang wars take place, creating a law and order problem in the coastal area.

The Superintendent of Police, Veerasangili (Deepan Chakravarthy) is asked by the government to sort out and stop the gang wars. Remember the earlier SP had disappeared, trying to bring the feud to an end.(actually he was chopped and his body was disposed of in the deep sea by Semmarai and his gang!) Veerasangli is a more committed man, and he tries to negotiate peace, but fails to bring Semmarai to the table, even after threatening him with encounter death. Semmarai with a pathological hatred for Shankar is obstinate that he will never allow peace as long as Shankar family holds sway, and then plays dirty. What happens next is told in a compelling and gripping manner, leading to a stunning climax.

Cast
Saravanan as Shankar Ayya
Deepan Chakravarthy as Veerasangili
Sanjay Ram
Sonika 
Thaniya
Alex
Anjusha
Sudhakar Vasanth
 Dhanya Mary Varghese

Soundtrack
Soundtrack was composed by Yugendran.
"Maane Mayilazhage" - K. S. Chithra
"Oru Kshanam" - Harish Raghavendra, Srilekha Parthsarathy
"Purusha Payale" - Karthik, Prashanthi
"Vaanam Thottu" - Yugendran
"Sapam Pudicha" - Swarnalatha

Reception
The Hindu wrote "Director Sanjayram, who has also taken care of the story, screenplay, dialogue, lyrics and production, has done a good job as far as the dialogue, lyrics and production are concerned. However, he should have concentrated on the screenplay, as this kind of storyline has been handled better in Tamil cinema." Indiaglitz wrote "Veeramum Eeramum is a raw action-film, sure to provide delight to action-buffs".

References

2007 films
2000s Tamil-language films
Indian gangster films
Films directed by Sanjay Ram